There are two coats of arms in official use in the Autonomous Province of Vojvodina, the Coat of arms of Vojvodina and the Traditional coat of arms of Vojvodina. Two coats of arms are given the equal status in the 
Provincial Assembly Decision on the Appearance and Usage of Symbols and Traditional Symbols of AP Vojvodina adopted in 2016.

The Assembly of Vojvodina adopted the Coat of arms of Vojvodina on 28 June 2002. The Assembly adopted the Traditional coat of arms on 15 September 2016. Coat of arms are based on the historical coat of arms of the Serbian Vojvodina from the flag of Zemun National Guard from 1848, as well as the historical coat of arms of the Principality of Serbia.

Description
The three fields of the coat of arms of Vojvodina bear the coats of arms of 3 historic regions of Vojvodina, granted in the 18th century:

Bačka. The coat of arms of Bačka was granted by Leopold I, Holy Roman Emperor (1657-1705) in 1699. It was later (1861) retained for the Batsch-Bodrog County. In blue field on a green grass stands Saint Paul wearing blue shirt and brown toga with golden nimbus holding in dexter a downpointed silver sword with golden hilt and in sinister a black book (Bible). The Bačka-Bodrog county was divided between Yugoslavia and Hungary after World War I. The northern part of it was later incorporated into Bács-Kiskun county of Hungary, that also uses the coat of arms with St. Paul in its dexter half.
Banat. The golden lion rampant on red holding a sabre was the coat of arms of the Banat of Temeswar (Serbian: Tamiški Banat). It was an Austrian crown land, its governor responding directly to the Emperor, and existed from 1718, when the area was taken over from the Ottoman Empire, to 1779, when it was abolished. The coat of arms of the Tamiš Banat is derived from the oldest arms of the Habsburg family, which were: Or a lion rampant gules armed langued and crowned azure. The arms denote the land as the Emperor's personal possession (hence the lion, only without the crown, and the colours, or and gules reversed and azure excluded, or in its place), which is situated at the border with the Ottoman Empire (hence the sabre in lion's paw). The coat of arms is nowadays used only in the part of Banat in Vojvodina. The coat of arms of the part of Banat in Romania is partly based on it, too: gules over waves azure a bridge with two arched openings or wherefrom issuing a demi-lion or holding a sabre in its right forepaw. Half of the lion also appears on the arms of Timiș County in Romania.
Srem. The third coat of arms is that of Srem, granted in 1747 by Empress Maria Theresa of Austria. The modern Croatian county of Vukovar-Syrmia uses the same coat of arms. The three white stripes on blue, representing the three rivers of Srem: Bosut, Sava and Danube. A deer rests close to a green poplar (topola) tree. The tree changed throughout history. In the original grant the tree was a cypress tree. The modern Croatian design preferred it to make it an oak tree, which is abundant in the region and is a kind of a national symbol. Similarly, the poplar is connected to Serbia (The royal family stems from a place named Topola).

Historical coat of arms
The historical coat of arms of Serbian Vojvodina was adopted in 1848. In its central part is a Serbian cross.

On the left and right side are a small coats of arms of the four historical regions of Serbian Vojvodina: Srem (upper left), Banat (upper right), Bačka (bottom left), and Baranja (bottom right).

On the top is a Crown of Saint Stephen. The crown was placed on the coat of arms because the first intention of Serbs was to create Serbian Vojvodina, which would be autonomous region within the Kingdom of Hungary, but since the war between Serbs and Hungarians started, the intention was changed into one that Serbian Vojvodina should be completely separated from the Kingdom of Hungary and directly subordinated to Vienna.

On March 17, 2015, the Assembly of Vojvodina failed to meet two-thirds of votes on the legislation of parallel use of the historical coat of arms and flag from 1848.

See also
Flag of Vojvodina
Coat of arms of Serbia

References

Culture of Vojvodina
Vojvodina
Vojvodina
Vojvodina
Vojvodina
Vojvodina
Vojvodina
Vojvodina